Laymen's Evangelical Fellowship International is a Christian organization founded in 1935 in Madras, India by N. Daniel (1897-1963/12/18), a former mathematics teacher at McLaurin High School in Kakinada, Andhra Pradesh, was headed from 1963 to 2014 by his son Joshua Daniel (1928/02/06 - 2014/10/18), and now by grandson John Daniel (1962/09/30 - ).

Headquartered in Chennai, India, the Church has centres in many parts of India, with the majority in the states of Tamil Nadu and Andhra Pradesh, as well as churches in Arunachal Pradesh, Assam, Delhi, Goa, Gujarat, Haryana, Himachal Pradesh, Kashmir, Jharkhand, Kerala, Manipur, Meghalaya, Maharashtra and several other Indian states.

Additionally, it has "tentmaker" missionaries (supported through their own work rather than by the organisation) in various countries such as Cyprus, Guyana, Venezuela, Ireland and the Brixton area of London, and radio broadcasts named "The Lord's Challenge" from Guyana, United Kingdom, France, Germany, Australia, and parts of the United States: in Buffalo, New York, Atlanta, Georgia, Council Bluffs, Iowa, and Detroit, Michigan).  Since January 2007, a weekly series of half-hour television broadcasts with same title as the radio broadcasts (The Lord's Challenge), have been going forth from Novi, Michigan. A RealVideo copy of each broadcast is available for play or download from the organisation's website.

Beautiful Books is the literature division of the Laymen's Evangelical Fellowship which publishes books in English and various Indian languages. Some of its popular publications are Another Daniel the biography of Mr. Daniel, Faith Is The Victory a daily-devotional guide which contains 366 messages by N. Daniel and Joshua Daniel, as well as Indian editions of their magazine Christ Is Victor. They are printed at Beulah Gardens, its retreat centre in Sirinium village,  from Red Hills, Chennai. Other editions of the magazine are printed abroad.

Annual retreats are held in "Beulah Gardens" located near Chennai. Approximately 7000 to 9000 people attend these retreats every year. Live webcast of retreats (including annual retreat, generally in May of the year) has been available from May 2008.

References 

My Conversion by Joshua Daniel
https://www.youtube.com/watch?v=m8fN0gX9FuI

Father of the great Revival in India
https://web.archive.org/web/20141210193712/http://www.formations.org.in/OrgForCofl/index.php?tmpl=component&view=article&id=180

External links 
 LEFI Website
 Lord's Challenge MP3 broadcast
 Beautiful Books

Christian organisations based in India
1935 establishments in India